The canton of Braine is a former administrative division in northern France. It was disbanded following the French canton reorganisation which came into effect in March 2015. It had 11,759 inhabitants (2012).

The canton comprised the following communes:

Acy
Augy
Bazoches-sur-Vesles
Blanzy-lès-Fismes
Braine
Brenelle
Bruys
Cerseuil
Chassemy
Chéry-Chartreuve
Ciry-Salsogne
Courcelles-sur-Vesles
Couvrelles
Cys-la-Commune
Dhuizel
Glennes
Jouaignes
Lesges
Lhuys
Limé
Longueval-Barbonval
Merval
Mont-Notre-Dame
Mont-Saint-Martin
Paars
Perles
Presles-et-Boves
Quincy-sous-le-Mont
Révillon
Saint-Mard
Saint-Thibaut
Serches
Sermoise
Serval
Tannières
Vasseny
Vauxcéré
Vauxtin
Viel-Arcy
Villers-en-Prayères
Ville-Savoye

Demographics

See also
Cantons of the Aisne department

References

Former cantons of Aisne
2015 disestablishments in France
States and territories disestablished in 2015